Groganville is a rural locality in the Shire of Mareeba, Queensland, Australia.

It was formerly a mining town and now has a very low population.

Geography 
The predominant land use is grazing on native vegetation. Almost the entire locality is within three pastoral stations: Groganville in the south, Palmerville in the north and Karma Waters to the east.

History
The name Groganville is derived from Patrick Grogan, who operated a shop in the town in the 1890s. It was formerly known as Limestone.

Patrick Grogan was the son of Bryan Grogan & Grandson of William Grogan convict per the Isabella in 1823. William Grogan held 9800 acres on the Lachland Valley way near Bowning in New South Wales. it was known as the Grogan Farm at Limestone Creek, a portion of it was split off to Bryan & became known as "Groganville" & was operated by Patrick's older half brother WJ Grogan. Patrick encouraged his brothers to the new gold fields of Far North Queensland. James Killian Grogan, John & Brian Grogan joined him, as did their father Bryan. The Grogan family owned many business ventures in the new town of Limestone creek including the butchering or abattoir business as well as the cordial factory and pubs in town as well as a large portion of the Anglo Saxon mine. Patrick Grogan was also one of the towns Justice of the peace.

Currently and historically, Gronganville is within the local government area of Shire of Mareeba, but between 2008 and 2013, the Shire of Mareeba was temporarily absolished and Groganville was within the Tablelands Region. 

Heritage listings
Groganville has a number of heritage-listed sites, including:
 Anglo Saxon Mine

Education 
There are no schools in Groganville and none within driving distance. Distance education or boarding school would be the main options for schooling.

See also
 List of tramways in Queensland

References

 
Towns in Queensland
Shire of Mareeba
Localities in Queensland